Astathes episcopalis is a species of beetle in the family Cerambycidae. It was described by Chevrolat in 1852. It is known from North Korea, Taiwan and China.

References

E
Beetles described in 1852